, also Portepeeunteroffizier(e), is the designation for German senior non-commissioned officers in the armed forces of Germany. The name derives from earlier traditions in which senior enlisted men carried a sword into battle. The word portepee derives from French port(e)-épée.

History 
Coloured sidearm tassels were introduced in the Prussian army in 1808. They were used as a decorative equipment and to differentiate companies within a regiment. Some units would wear honorary tassels of Russian red leather, to indicate their relation to the 1st Regiment of (Prussian) Grenadier Guards.  would wear tassels independently of their company relations.

The top-down sequence of ranks in that group is:
OR-9: Oberstabsfeldwebel / Oberstabsbootsmann this rank was introduced by the Bundeswehr in 1983
OR-8: Stabsfeldwebel / Stabsbootsmann (in the Kriegsmarine Stabsoberbootsmann, Stabsobersteuermann, and Stabsobermaschinist)
OR-7: Hauptfeldwebel (Oberfähnrich)/ Hauptbootsmann (Oberfähnrich zur See), this rank was introduced by the Bundeswehr after an assignment/position of service (informally Spieß and officially now Kompaniefeldwebel in the Reichswehr, Wehrmacht, and National People's Army)
OR-6a: Oberfeldwebel / Oberbootsmann
OR-6b: Feldwebel / Bootsmann

Naval equivalents—replacing Feldwebel with Bootsmann—and, historically, the Cavalry and Artillery (replacing with Wachtmeister). The latter is not to be confused with the Navy's "Kompaniefeldwebel" of today which are also called Wachtmeister.

German NCOs were identified by the use of metallic lace (called Tresse) on the collar of the uniform jacket, as well as the edges of the shoulder straps. Senior non-commissioned officers in the Wehrmacht also used silver "stars" on the shoulder strap to differentiate between ranks; one star for a Feldwebel, two for an Oberfeldwebel, and three for a Stabsfeldwebel.

Table of Portepee-ranks

See also
 Unteroffiziere ohne Portepee - NCOs without portepee
 Rank insignia of the German Bundeswehr

References 

 

Military ranks of Germany